Mokrá-Horákov is a municipality in Brno-Country District in the South Moravian Region of the Czech Republic. It has about 2,800 inhabitants.

Administrative parts
The municipality is made up of villages of Mokrá and Horákov.

Notable people
Miloslava Misáková (1922–2015), gymnast, Olympic winner

References

Villages in Brno-Country District